The Radium Girls were female factory workers who contracted radiation poisoning from painting watch dials with self-luminous paint. The incidents occurred at three different factories in United States: one in Orange, New Jersey, beginning around 1917; one in Ottawa, Illinois, beginning in the early 1920s; and a third facility in Waterbury, Connecticut, also in the 1920s.

After being told that the paint was harmless, the women in each facility ingested deadly amounts of radium after being instructed to "point" their brushes on their lips in order to give them a fine tip; some also painted their fingernails, faces and teeth with the glowing substance. The women were instructed to point their brushes in this way because using rags or a water rinse caused them to use more time and material, as the paint was made from powdered radium, gum arabic and water.

Five of the women in New Jersey challenged their employer in a case over the right of individual workers who contract occupational diseases to sue their employers under New Jersey's occupational injuries law, which at the time had a two-year statute of limitations, but settled out of court in 1928. Five women in Illinois who were employees of the Radium Dial Company (which was unaffiliated with the United States Radium Corporation) sued their employer under Illinois law, winning damages in 1938.

United States Radium Corporation

From 1917 to 1926, U.S. Radium Corporation, originally called the Radium Luminous Material Corporation, was engaged in the extraction and purification of radium from carnotite ore to produce luminous paints, which were marketed under the brand name "Undark". The ore was mined from the Paradox Valley in Colorado and other "Undark mines" in Utah. As a defense contractor, U.S. Radium was a major supplier of radioluminescent watches to the military. Their plant in Orange, New Jersey, employed as many as 300 workers, mainly women, to paint radium-lit watch faces and instruments, misleading them that it was safe.

Radiation exposure
U.S. Radium Corporation (USRC) hired approximately 70 women to perform various tasks including handling radium, while the owners and the scientists familiar with the effects of radium carefully avoided any exposure to it themselves. Chemists at the plant used lead screens, masks and tongs. USRC had distributed literature to the medical community describing the "injurious effects" of radium. In spite of this knowledge, a number of similar deaths had occurred by 1925, including the company's chief chemist, Dr. Edwin E. Leman, and several female workers. The similar circumstances of their deaths prompted investigations by Dr. Harrison Martland, County Physician of Newark.

An estimated 4,000 workers were hired by corporations in the U.S. and Canada to paint watch faces with radium. At USRC, each of the painters mixed her own paint in a small crucible, and then used camel hair brushes to apply the glowing paint onto dials. The rate of pay, for painting 250 dials a day, was about a penny and a half per dial. The brushes would lose shape after a few strokes, so the USRC supervisors encouraged their workers to point the brushes with their lips ("lip, dip, paint"), or use their tongues to keep them sharp. Because the true nature of the radium had been kept from them, the Radium Girls painted their nails, teeth, and faces for fun with the deadly paint produced at the factory. Many of the workers became sick; over 30 died from exposure to radiation by 1927. Several are buried in Orange's Rosedale Cemetery.

Radiation poisoning 

Dentists were among the first to see numerous problems among dial painters. Dental pain, loose teeth, lesions and ulcers, and the failure of tooth extractions to heal were some of these conditions. Many of the women later began to develop anemia, bone fractures, and necrosis of the jaw, a condition now known as radium jaw. The women also experienced suppression of menstruation, and sterility. It is thought that the X-ray machines used by these medical investigators may have contributed to some of the sickened workers' ill-health by subjecting them to additional radiation. It turned out at least one of the examinations was a ruse, part of a campaign of disinformation started by the defense contractor. U.S. Radium and other watch-dial companies rejected claims that the affected workers were suffering from exposure to radium.  For some time, doctors, dentists, and researchers complied with requests from the companies not to release their data.

In 1923, the first dial painter died, and before her death, her jaw fell away from her skull. By 1924, 50 women who had worked at the plant were ill, and a dozen had died. At the urging of the companies, worker deaths were attributed by medical professionals to other causes. Syphilis, a notorious sexually transmitted infection at the time, was often cited in attempts to smear the reputations of the women.

The inventor of radium dial paint, Dr. Sabin Arnold von Sochocky, died in November 1928, becoming the 16th known victim of poisoning by radium dial paint. He had gotten sick from radium in his hands, not the jaw, but the circumstances of his death helped the Radium Girls in court.

Radium Dial Company

The Radium Dial Company was established in Ottawa, Illinois, in 1922, in the town's former high school.  Like the United States Radium Corporation, the purpose of the studio in Ottawa was to paint dials for clocks, their largest client being Westclox Corporation in Peru, Illinois. Dials painted in Ottawa appeared on Westclox's popular Big Ben, Baby Ben and travel clocks; and like United States Radium Corporation, Radium Dial hired young women to paint the dials, using the same "lip, dip, paint" approach as the women in New Jersey and by another unaffiliated plant in Waterbury, Connecticut, that supplied the Waterbury Clock Company.

Following the termination of President Joseph Kelly from the concern, Kelly established a competing firm in the town named Luminous Process Company, which also employed women in the same fashion, and in the conditions as the other firms. Employees at Radium Dial began showing signs of radium poisoning in 1926–1927 and were unaware of the hearings and trials in New Jersey. Furthermore, Radium Dial leadership authorized physicals and other tests designed to determine the toxicity of radium paint to its employees, but the company never gave those records to the employees or told them of the results. In a half-hearted attempt to end the use of the camel hair brushes, management introduced glass pens with a fine point; however, the workers found that the pens slowed their productivity (they were paid by the piece), and they reverted to using brushes. When word of the New Jersey women and their suits appeared in local newspapers, the women were told that the radium was safe and that employees in New Jersey were showing signs of viral infections. Assured by their employers that the radium was safe, they returned to work as usual.

Significance

Litigation

In Orange, New Jersey, the story of the abuse perpetrated against the workers is distinguished from most such cases by the fact that the ensuing litigation was covered widely by the media. Plant worker Grace Fryer decided to sue, but it took two years for her to find a lawyer willing to take on U.S. Radium. Even after the women found a lawyer, the litigation process moved slowly. At their first appearance in court in January 1928, two women were bedridden and none of them could raise their arms to take an oath. A total of five factory workers – Grace Fryer, Edna Hussman, Katherine Schaub, and sisters Quinta McDonald and Albina Larice – dubbed the Radium Girls, joined the suit. The litigation and media sensation surrounding the case established legal precedents and triggered the enactment of regulations governing labor safety standards, including a baseline of "provable suffering".

In Illinois, employees began asking for compensation for their medical and dental bills as early as 1927 but were refused by management. The demand for money by sick and dying former employees continued into the mid-1930s before a suit was brought before the Illinois Industrial Commission (IIC). In 1937 five women found an attorney by the name of Leonard Grossman, who would represent them in front of the commission, but by this time, Radium Dial had closed, moving to New York.  The IIC did retain a $10,000 deposit left by Radium Dial when it disclosed to the IIC that they could not find any insurance to cover the cost of indemnifying the company against employee suits. In the spring of 1938, the IIC ruled in favor of the women. The attorney representing the interests of Radium Dial appealed hoping to get the verdict overturned, and again the commission judge, George B. Marvel, found for the women. Radium Dial appealed over and over, taking the case all the way to the Supreme Court and on October 23, 1939, the court decided not to hear the appeal and the lower ruling was upheld. In the end, this case had been won eight times before Radium Dial was finally forced to pay.

Historical impact

The Radium Girls' saga holds an important place in the history of both the field of health physics and the labor rights movement. The right of individual workers to sue for damages from corporations due to labor abuse was established as a result of the Radium Girls case. In the wake of the case, industrial safety standards were demonstrably enhanced for many decades.

The Radium Girls' case was settled in the autumn of 1928, before the trial was deliberated by the jury, and the settlement for each of the Radium Girls was $10,000 and a $600 per year annuity paid $12 a week for all of their lives while they lived, and all medical and legal expenses incurred would also be paid by the company.

The lawsuit and resulting publicity was a factor in the establishment of occupational disease labor law.  Radium dial painters were instructed in proper safety precautions and provided with protective gear; in particular, they no longer shaped paint brushes by lip and avoided ingesting or breathing the paint. Radium paint was still used in dials as late as the 1970s.

Scientific impact

Robley D. Evans made the first measurements of exhaled radon and radium excretion from a former dial painter in 1933. At MIT he gathered dependable body content measurements from 27 dial painters. This information was used in 1941 by the National Bureau of Standards to establish the tolerance level for radium of 0.1 μCi (3.7 kBq).

The Center for Human Radiobiology was established at Argonne National Laboratory in 1968. The primary purpose of the center was providing medical examinations for living dial painters. The project also focused on the collection of information and, in some cases, tissue samples from the radium dial painters. When the project ended in 1993, detailed information of 2,403 cases had been collected. This led to a book on the effects of radium on humans. The book suggests that radium-228 exposure is more harmful to health than exposure to radium-226. Radium-228 is more able to cause cancer of the bone as the shorter half life of the radon-220 product compared to radon-222 causes the daughter nuclides of radium-228 to deliver a greater dose of alpha radiation to the bones. It also considers the induction of a range of different forms of cancer as a result of internal exposure to radium and its daughter nuclides. The book used data from radium dial painters, people who were exposed as a result of the use of radium-containing medical products, and other groups of people who had been exposed to radium.

In literature, music and film 

The story inspired the Italian songwriter Ottavia Brown to dedicate the song "Non solo le stelle brillano" (Not Only the Stars Shine) to them on the album Signora Nessun released in 2020. 
The story is told from the point of view of the women in New Jersey, and Illinois, in Kate Moore's non-fiction book The Radium Girls released in the UK in 2016 and US in 2017.
The story is told in Eleanor Swanson's poem "Radium Girls", collected in A Thousand Bonds: Marie Curie and the Discovery of Radium (2003).
Poet Lavinia Greenlaw has written on the subject in The Innocence of Radium (Night Photograph, 1994).
Historian Claudia Clark wrote an account of the case and its wider historical implications: Radium Girls: Women and Industrial Health Reform, 1910–1935 (published 1997).
Ross Mullner's book Deadly Glow: The Radium Dial Worker Tragedy describes many of the events (1999).
The story is told by Jo Lawrence in her short animated film Glow (2007).
Michael Martone's short story "It's Time" is told from the perspective of an unnamed Radium Girl.
A fictionalized version of the story was featured in the Spike TV show 1000 Ways to Die (#196) and Science Channel's Dark Matters: Twisted But True.
Radium Halos: A Novel About the Radium Dial Painters a 2009 novel by Shelley Stout is historical fiction narrated by a sixty-five-year-old mental patient who worked at the factory when she was sixteen.
 Author Robert R. Johnson features a story on the radium girls in his book Romancing the Atom.
The Case of the Living Dead Women, a Website, displays scans of 180 pages of newspaper clippings about a similar incident, the Ottawa, Illinois Radium Dial Company litigation.
 A fictionalized version of the story was featured in the 1937 short story "Letter to the Editor" by James H. Street, adapted into a 1937 film Nothing Sacred and a 1953 Broadway musical Hazel Flagg.
The documentary Radium City depicts first hand accounts of some of the watch dial painters in Ottawa, IL.
A version of the story for a young adult readership is told in the novel Glow by Megan E. Bryant.
A play named These Shining Lives was written by Melanie Marnich and Dramatists Play Service Inc. and is narrated by Catherine Wolfe Donohue, one of four protagonist workers who sued in Illinois.
Luminous: The Story of a Radium Girl (2020) by Samantha Wilcoxson is a biographical fiction novel featuring Catherine Donohue.
A film was set to release on April 3, 2020, named Radium Girls starring Joey King, however, it was delayed due to COVID-19
A 2000 play Radium Girls by D. W. Gregory is based on the incident.
The Scottish Band Idlewild refers to the fate of the Radium Girls in the song "Radium Girl" on the album Everything Ever Written.
The story inspired Tom Morello to write the song ″Radium Girls″ which appeared on Tom Morello And The Bloody Beetroots' collaborative album in 2021. Tom Morello spent summers as a child in Marseilles, Illinois, a central Illinois town near Ottawa, Illinois, where the Radium Dial Company was established in 1922.
 'Half Lives: The Unlikely History of Radium' (2020) by Lucy Jane Santos has details of the Radium Girls and the fight for justice..

See also
 Breaker boy
 Katherine Rotan Drinker and Cecil Kent Drinker, who researched the Radium Girls
 Hiroshima maidens
 Labor law
 Labor history
 Labor rights
 Occupational disease
 Phossy jaw
 Nuclear labor issues
 Radioactive contamination
 Radium silk
 Tritium radioluminescence

References

External links
 Rutgers University – 'University Libraries Special Collections: U.S. Radium Corporation, East Orange, NJ', Records, Catalog 1917–1940
 Undark and the Radium Girls, Alan Bellows, December 28, 2006, Damn Interesting
 Radium Girls, Eleanor Swanson. copy of original
 Poison Paintbrush, Time, June 4, 1928. "That the world may see streaks of light through the long hours of darkness, Orange, N.J., women hired themselves to the U.S. Radium Corporation."
 Radium Women, Time, August 11, 1930. "Five young New Jersey women who were poisoned while painting luminous watch dials for U.S. Radium Corp., two years ago heard doctors pronounce their doom: one year to live."
 Mae Keane, The Last 'Radium Girl,' Dies At 107, NPR
 Radium City (1987), documentary
Radium Girls (2018), feature film

Advocacy groups in the United States
History of labor relations in the United States
History of women in Illinois
History of women in New Jersey
Nuclear safety and security
Orange, New Jersey
Radium
History of women in Connecticut
Ottawa, Illinois